Philip Packer FRS (24 June 1618 Groombridge, Kent – 24 December 1686) was an English barrister and architect. He was a courtier to Charles II, and friend to Christopher Wren.

He was educated at University College, Oxford where he matriculated in 1635. He then took up law at the Middle Temple and was called to the bar as a barrister in 1647.

He rebuilt Groombridge Place with Wren's help in 1662.<ref>[https://books.google.com/books?id=ecDXfMBMwfkC&pg=PA292 England 2010], Darwin Porter, Danforth Prince, Frommer's, 2009, </ref>  On 21 May 1669, he met with Samuel Pepys.  He was an Original Fellow of the Royal Society.

Family

His parents were John Packer, Clerk of the Privy Seal (12 Nov 1572 – 15 Feb 1649), and Philippi Mills.

He married Isabella Berkeley in 1653 in Groombridge, Kent; they had seven children:
Robert Packer (died aged 16) 
John Philip Packer Esq. of Groombridge (1655 Groombridge – 16 December 1697)
Katherine Packer (1661 Groombridge, Kent, England – 30 Nov 1722 Finedon, Northampton, England)
Isabella Packer
Elizabeth Packer
Temperance Packer (1663)

He married Sarah Isgar on 20 December 1666. Prior to their marriage, Philip and Sarah had three children in Ireland where Philip owned extensive properties:
Philip Packer, who emigrated to New Jersey.
James Packer (3 March 1657 – 12 Jul 1690) at the Battle of the Boyne, Ireland.
William Packer (died 1690 in Battle of Boyne).

References

External links
History of the Royal Society, Thomas Thomson
"The Accompt of William Balle from 28 November 1660 to 11 September 1663", Notes and Records of the Royal Society of London'', Vol. 14, No. 2 (Jun., 1960), pp. 174–183

17th-century English architects
1618 births
1686 deaths
Original Fellows of the Royal Society
Alumni of University College, Oxford
Architects from Kent
People from Groombridge